The Estadio Monumental (Monumental Stadium) is a football stadium in the district of Ate in Lima, Peru. It is the home of Club Universitario de Deportes, and it was opened in 2000 to replace the Estadio Teodoro Lolo Fernandez. Its only legal owner is the club itself. Designed by Progreso International and Gremco S.A., Uruguayan architect Walter Lavalleja Sarriés led the construction of the stadium. At the time of its construction, it became Peru's largest stadium and also the 5th largest in South America. Since its expansion to 80,000 capacity in early 2020s, it has become the second-largest stadium by seating capacity on the continent.  
The stadium was built in accordance with FIFA’s manual of technical specifications for World Cup finals.

The stadium has hosted some of the Peru national football team's international matches including FIFA World Cup Qualifiers. It also hosted the final stages of the 2008 Copa Perú. However, the Monumental was absent from the organization of the 2004 Copa América because of conflicts between the club and the organizers. In addition, between its opening in 2000 until 2007, only one edition of the Peruvian Clásico was played due to security concerns; however, in late 2008, the derby returned to the stadium.

On November 5, 2019, the Estadio Monumental was selected by CONMEBOL to host the 2019 Copa Libertadores Final, after the outbreak of 2019 Chilean protests raised security concerns about the development of the match in Santiago, city initially chosen as host.

Building
There are 3 fields; the stadium field and two training grounds. The stadium is divided into two main sections; the lower section of stands for the general public and the upper section of 6 floors of luxury boxes. The lower section of the stadium consists of four stands—known as Norte, Sur, Oriente, and Occidente (North, South, East, and West respectively)—each having its own entrance. The east and west stands are all-seaters, while the north and south stands have standing terraces. Behind the western and eastern stands, there is a handicapped zone. In the center of the western stand the Palco Oficial is situated for about 600 spectators, which has a private entrance and commodities such as bathrooms and a cafeteria. Together, these four stands can receive 65,000 spectators. The upper section consists of the luxury box suites which are 1,250 in total for 20,000 spectators approximately; the suite owners have a private parking lot.

Modern floodlighting was installed, with a total of 160 Ultra Sport General Electric spotlights of 2,000 watts with four levels of illumination. Above the northern stand, an LED display electronic scoreboard stands which measures . Above the southern stand, a Philips screen is situated that measures . Above the western stand, a surveillance room with eight security cameras monitoring the interiors and exteriors of the stadium. The field is watered by sprinkler irrigation.

The stadium has four changing rooms which are below the western stand; two of them are the main changing rooms for the main game the stadium hosts, while the other two are for teams participating in a preliminary match. The changing rooms include showers, bathrooms, dressing rooms, and massage rooms. The main changing rooms have an office for the manager of the team. There is also an anti-doping room, a referees changing room, and a chapel. Below the southern stand is a changing room for musical concert personnel.

In the western stand–Occidente–the first floor of the upper section was exclusively made for the media and press. There are 168 positions for newspaper journalists in addition to 32 cabins for radio broadcasts as well as 5 specially-made positions for television broadcasts. Two photography laboratories are available. Several rooms are also available for the press, press conferences, telecommunications, and accreditation.

Tenants
Universitario de Deportes is the Monumental's principal tenant as well as the owner of the entire sports complex. The football club plays its home games for domestic and international matches since its opening in 2000. The inaugural match was played on 2 July 2000 against Sporting Cristal for the local Primera División with a record assistance of 54,708 spectators (not counting luxury boxes). The new stadium replaced the club's Estadio Teodoro Lolo Fernandez which now serves as the club's social headquarters in addition to a training centre. Since its opening, the most important derby of Peru has been repeatedly prohibited from being played there because of security issues. On 26 June 2002, the derby was allowed to be played for the first time at the Monumental between Universitario and Alianza Lima for the Torneo Apertura trophy. This first leg match was a 1–0 victory for Universitario; however the aftermath of the match inside and outside of stadium was disastrous leading to further prohibition of the match from the Monumental. After the derby's six-year absence from the Monumental, on 14 September 2008 the Estadio Monumental hosted a second derby after the club fought bitterly, seeking the authorities' approval to be able to host the game. This time the derby was successfully hosted without security issues and subsequently the stadium was not rejected for further derby matches in the following seasons.

The Peru national football team has been a minor tenant of the Monumental. Although the Estadio Nacional is the national team's home venue, on more than one occasion has Peru played at the Monumental. The first match Peru played at the Monumental was on 2 June 2001 against Ecuador for the 2002 FIFA World Cup Qualifiers. The match was an unfortunate 2–1 loss for the home side. A second qualifier was played later that year against Bolivia which was also their last fixture of the 2002 qualifiers which ended in a 1–1 draw. The Monumental hosted a third match for the national team in 2003, however this was only a friendly against Paraguay; the match was Peru's second loss at this stadium. Peru's fourth match at the Monumental was a new qualifying match in 2003 for the 2006 FIFA World Cup against Brazil. The match was 1–1 draw and there was a record assistance of 59,566 spectators. Due to the installation of artificial turf at the Estadio Nacional, the Estadio Monumental hosted 8 of Peru's 2010 FIFA World Cup Qualifiers. Of these 8 matches, 2 wins were achieved against Venezuela and Uruguay, both 1–0 victories.

The stadium hosted the Finalisima of the 2008 Copa Perú. This was the final stage of Peru's promotion tournament in which four teams played in six matches in order to gain promotion to the first division. The champion Sport Huancayo and runner-up Colegio Nacional Iquitos were promoted the first division while third place Atlético Torino and fourth place Cobresol FBC were promoted to the Segunda División.

The Monumental had a chance to be a venue for the 2004 Copa América, however conflict ignited between the club and the tournament organizers which led to the absence of this stadium from the event.

Peru national football team records

Notable events
Estadio Monumenta has played host to several world-acclaimed musical artists such as: 
 Sui Generis - Reunion Tour, 2001
 Alejandro Sanz - No Es Lo Mismo Tour, 2004
 Roger Waters - The Dark Side of the Moon Live, 2007
 Kylie Minogue - KylieX2008, 2008
 The Killers - Day & Age Tour, 2009
 Beyoncé - I Am... World Tour, 2010
 Guns N' Roses - Chinese Democracy Tour, 2010
 The Black Eyed Peas - The E.N.D World Tour, 2010
 Paul McCartney - Up and Coming Tour, 2011
 Miley Cyrus - Gypsy Heart Tour, 2011
 Britney Spears - Femme Fatale Tour, 2011
 Maroon 5 - Overexposed Tour, 2012
 The Rolling Stones - América Latina Olé Tour 2016, 2016
 Guns N' Roses - Not in This Lifetime... Tour, 2016
 Roger Waters - Us + Them Tour, 2018

Explanada del Estadio Monumental
Other notable events took place in an open area south of the stadium premises, commonly known as "Explanada del Estadio Monumental" and often mistakenly regarded as part of the complex; not to be confused with the south parking lot actually belonging to the stadium that also serves as a music venue for shows holding less than 40,000 people.

Depeche Mode performed at the open area on October 13, 2009, during their Tour of the Universe, in front of a crowd of 30,000 people.

Christian events
Nigerian Pastor T.B. Joshua held a two-day crusade in September 2016 which attracted nearly 100,000 over both days and made headlines in local Peruvian media.

References

External links
 Satellite picture by Google Maps

Monumental U
Monumental U
Sports venues in Lima
Sports venues completed in 2000
2000 establishments in Peru